Methandriol propionate (brand name Metilbisexovis), or methylandrostenediol propionate, also known as 17α-methylandrost-5-ene-3β,17β-diol 3β-propionate, is a synthetic, injected anabolic-androgenic steroid (AAS) and a 17α-alkylated derivative of 5-androstenediol that is or was marketed by Vister in Italy. It is an androgen ester – specifically, the C3,17β propionate ester of methandriol (17α-methyl-5-androstenediol) – and acts as a prodrug of methandriol in the body. Methandriol propionate is administered by intramuscular injection and, relative to methandriol, has an extended duration via this route due to a depot effect afforded by its ester.

See also
 Methandriol bisenanthoyl acetate
 Methandriol diacetate
 Methandriol dipropionate

References

Androgen esters
Androgens and anabolic steroids
Androstanes
Propionate esters
Tertiary alcohols
World Anti-Doping Agency prohibited substances